Guy Haley (born June 6, 1973) is an English writer of speculative fiction, predominantly known for his Richards & Klein Investigations series, as well as numerous fiction contributions to various Warhammer 40,000 series.

Bibliography

Warhammer 40,000
Contributed over 30 works to the greater Warhammer universe, with another 50 works to the following Warhammer 40,000 series:
 Adeptus Mechanicus (2019)
 Angels of Death (2013)
 Astra Militarum (2020)
 Blood Angels (2017-2022)
 Dark Imperium (2018-2021)
 Dawn of Fire (2020)
 Imperial Guard (2013-2016)
 Lords of the Space Marines (2013)
 Space Marine Battles (2013-2017)
 The Beast Arises (2016-2018)
 The Horus Heresy (2016-2020)
 The Siege of Terra (2019)

Richards & Klein Investigations Series
 Nemesis Worm (2011)
 Reality 36 (2011)
 Omega Point (2012)

The Dreaming Cities Series
 The Emperor's Railroad (2016)
 The Ghoul King (2016)

Standalone Novels
 Champion of Mars (2012)
 Crash (2013)

Nonfiction
 Sci-Fi Chronicles: A Visual History of the Galaxy's Greatest Science Fiction. Nominated for a Grand Prix de l'Imaginaire award in 2016.

Critical studies and reviews of Haley's work
Sci-Fi Chronicles

References

External links

Living people
1973 births
British science fiction writers